Mātauranga (literally Māori knowledge) is a modern term for the traditional knowledge of the Māori people of New Zealand. Māori traditional knowledge is multi-disciplinary and  holistic, and there is considerable overlap between concepts. It includes environmental stewardship and economic development, with the purpose of preserving Māori culture and improving the quality of life of the Māori people over time.

The ancestors of the Māori first settled in New Zealand (Aotearoa) from other Polynesian islands in the late 13th century CE and developed a distinctive culture and knowledge-system. Mātauranga covers the entire time-period since then. Therefore it includes oceanic navigation and other knowledge shared across the Polynesian world. Due to European colonisation, beginning in the early 19th century, much mātauranga has been lost or highly influenced by Christianity and by other aspects of foreign culture. From the 1960s mātauranga has achieved renewed importance both in Māori and wider New Zealand culture.

Mātauranga Māori has only recently gained recognition in the scientific community for including some knowledge consistent with the scientific method; it was previously perceived by scientific institutions and researchers as entirely mythological lore, entirely superseded by modern science. In the 21st century, Mātauranga is often used by academics and government institutions when addressing particular environmental problems, with institutions or organisations partnering with iwi, typically with government funding.

Etymology and meaning 
Mātauranga Māori as a phrase became popular in the 1980s after being adopted by the New Zealand Government and in tertiary education. The term became useful in part due to the Treaty of Waitangi claims process which included requests for the protection of traditional knowledge.

Kaupapa Māori is the foundation or principles of Māori thought. It is the governing principles from which mātauranga was created. The exact relationship of the two domains is not set, however they are distinct concepts.

History 

Mātauranga was traditionally preserved through spoken language, including songs, supplemented carving weaving, and painting, including tattoos. Since colonisation, mātauranga has been preserved and shared through writing, first by non Māori Anthropologists and Missionaries, then by Māori.

When mātauranga was recorded by anthropologists, the process was hampered by their preconceptions. It was common practice to try to synthesis the geographic variation in mātauranga, leading to the creation of a single Māori oral history (e.g. the Great Fleet) and culture. These anthropologists informants were also sometimes paid per page for information.

Māori society refers to its traditional experts in healing as tohunga. Tohunga were often the only source of medicinal knowledge and education in Māori culture. The New Zealand Parliament passed the Tohunga Suppression Act in 1907 which made tohunga practices illegal and punishable by fines or imprisonment. The Tohunga Suppression Act was finally repealed in 1962 under the Māori Community Development Act. Although it caused in part the erasure of Māori knowledge and science, the legislation failed at large. The New Zealand Government's intent was to inhibit traditional practices, yet some Māori people remained faithful to tohunga.

Frameworks 
As mātauranga stresses the connection of all knowledge there is no single system for its division into sub-disciplines. Whakapapa and the Māori language (te reo Māori ) are considered key overarching concepts. Whakapapa represents the connection between the natural and human world due to its common origin. It is commonly believed that mātauranga can be best understood in its own language and is the only way to preserve mātauranga in the future.

Measurement

Distance 
There are two general types of distance measurement in mātauranga Māori, those based on the human body and those based on measuring stick or rope. The human based measurement system included many different units, such as 'maro' which was the span of the arms outstretched horizontally. It is suspected that these systems were only of local use due to variation between people. The 'kumi' was the length of ten 'maro', this is the only recorded multiplier in mātauranga. Our evidence of the human based system is highly reliant on the anthropologist Elsdon Best. 

The measuring-rod (rauru) was a way of preserving a particular human dimension. Some rauru were passed down through the generations as sacred objects and recorded the dimensions of import ancestors. Ropes were also used in measurement particularly in the construction of building's floor plans.

Time 
Mātauranga uses astronomical observations, primarily of the sun and moon to measure time. The moon's phases are used to define the main subdivision of the year (maramataka). The timing of the New Year varied regionally across New Zealand, but was often based around the Pleiades star cluster (Matariki). Some iwi for example used the first new moon after the appearance of Matariki as the start of the new year. 

The different lunar cycles of the year and the four recognized seasons were used to plan agriculture and activities, such as fishing.

The natural world 
The earth mother Papatūānuku and land (Whenua) is also the name for a placenta. Genealogies are often used to show the connection between natural phenomena. As example Parawhenuamea (the personification of water) married her brother Putoto. Their son Rakahore married Hinekuku (the clay maiden), their children were Tuamatua (guardian of rocks found on the sea shore) and Whatuaho (greywacke and chert) and Papakura (volcanic rocks).  

Rocks that had practical utility (mana) like jade (Pounamu) or Metasomatised sedimentary rock (Pakohe) were mostly sourced from rivers and the sea shore. However, throughout the mountains of the South Island outcrops were also quarried.    

Soil maintenance and modification was common for horticulture. This included adding gravel or sand for drainage and seaweed for fertilizer. Mātauranga concern for soil is also shown by there being more than 33 known names for different kinds.

Cultivation of kūmara

By the time that European settlers arrived, Māori had large plantations of kūmara growing in many parts of New Zealand.  According to Māori oral history, kūmara were not onboard the original canoes that settled New Zealand, but were introduced following multiple return voyages into the Pacific.  Kūmara were traditionally grown as far south as Banks Peninsula. This is approximately 1,000km further south than kūmara had been grown anywhere else in the world.  The variety grown by Māori prior to the 19th century had a white skin and whitish flesh, unlike today's purple or orange-skinned varieties.  The pre-European varieties grown by Māori can be left in the ground year-round in the tropics, but in the cool conditions of New Zealand, the tubers will spoil if left in cold soil over winter and spring. A wide range of techniques were developed to ensure reliable production, including careful choice of growing locations, drainage, the application of mulch and other materials to increase soil temperatures, the construction of walls to shelter the crop from the wind, and the lifting and careful storage of tubers during winter.

Notable people
One notable woman was Wahakaotirangi, whose name translates to "completion from the sky". As one of New Zealand's first scientists, Wahakaotirangi brought kumara to the Waikato region. When in Waikato, Wahakaotirangi built gardens in which she experimented with growing edible and medicinal plants, in particular studying how to make the kumara grow in its cooler climate. This was an essential innovation for the Tainui people of Waikato, as it provided them a reliable and sustainable source of food. Wahakaotirangi was also a part of the invention and launch of the Tainui canoe.

Another notable woman was Pirongia-te-aroaro-ō-Kahu, or more commonly known as Kahupeka. Following her husband's death and her own illness, she journeyed across King Country and studied the medicinal uses of native plants such as harakeke, koromiko, kawakawa, and rangiora.  Kahupeka's experiments helped the Māori people towards properly utilizing hundreds of different medicinal plants.

Modern practice 
Mātauranga has a strong influence on the thought of most Māori today.Most traditional Māori science is now focused on a particular practical problem with science-based organisations partnering with iwi, typically with government funding. Outputs include traditional scientific publications, as well as concrete benefits for iwi. Some examples include the geothermal toxicity in food and identifying novel antimicrobial compounds.

Traditional Māori science had major impacts on New Zealand. For example, Wahakaotirangi’s innovations in agriculture ensured the formation and survival of the Tainui people. This influence persists, and is seen in such cases as the New Zealand Department of Conservation’s Biodiversity Strategy, which states that by 2020, “traditional Māori knowledge, or mātauranga Māori, about biodiversity is respected and preserved and informs biodiversity management”.

Politicisation and critique of mātauranga

Effectiveness of environmental stewardship 
Archeology and quaternary geology show that New Zealand's natural environment changed significantly during the period of precolonial Māori occupation. This has led some academics to question the effectiveness of Māori traditional knowledge in managing the environment. The environmental changes are similar to those following human occupation in other parts of the world, including deforestation (approximately 50%), the loss of the megafauna, more general species extinctions and soil degradation due to agriculture. The models favoured by academics today describe precolonial Māori as accessing resources based on ease of access and energy return. This would have involved moving from one location or food source to another when the original one had become less rewarding. Historically academic models on precolonial environmental stewardship have been closely tied to the idea of the 'Noble Savage'. and the now debunked hypothesis of multiple ethnicities being responsible for different aspects of New Zealand's archeological record.

Relationship to institutional science 
After the Māori Renaissance, Māori academics campaigned for the creation of independent Māori Studies departments. There was a general sentiment that Māori mātauranga should be studied by Māori people, particularly in the fields of anthropology and archeology. The history of traditional Māori scientific advancements is taught at a tertiary level at Victoria University of Wellington and Canterbury University.

Under colonisation Māori people, and women in particular, were treated as subjects rather than as creators of scientific knowledge, a treatment which continues to affect the sociological context of Māori women in science to this day. Notable women in the field of traditional Māori science include Makereti Papakura, who wrote a thesis on the Māori people, and Rina Winifred Moore, the first female Māori doctor in New Zealand. The Royal Society Te Apārangi also identifies 150 women and their notable contributions to New Zealand in the field of science.

See also 
Māori and conservation
Māori music
Māori traditional textiles
Medicinal plants
Native American ethnobotany
Pharmacognosy
Listener letter on science controversy

References

Sources

External links 
New Zealand Government education on mātauranga.

Academic disciplines
Decolonization
Māori culture
Science and technology in New Zealand
Traditional knowledge